Viva Freedom! (자유만세, Jayu Manse, aka Hurrah! For Freedom) is a 1946 Korean film directed by Choi In-kyu. It was the first film made in the country after achieving independence from Japan. During the colonial period, Choi was only allowed to make certain films, but the plot of Viva Freedom! is distinctly different, telling the story of a Korean patriotic resistance fighter in 1945.

Plot
Protagonist Choi Han-Jung, who was imprisoned for his independence activism, succeeds in breaking out of prison. Upon escaping, he stays with a comrade in the cause for independence, Park Jin-beom. He meets his other political comrades in a basement under a house built in a western-style and persuades them to continue their resistance to the Japanese Kenpeitai in the 1940s when the fall of the Japanese empire was imminent. However, a member of the movement gets caught by the Japanese while moving the dynamite, which leads to Choi striving to save him and ends up surrounded by the Japanese military police. He hides in the residence of Mi-hyang, who is a mistress of the Japanese police high official Nanbu (南部). A gunfight with the Kenpeitai ensues, which leads to Choi being injured and imprisoned in a university hospital while receiving treatment. With the help of nurse Hye-ja who loved Choi, Han-jung can keep doing his endeavors for independence. With the atomic bomb on Hiroshima and Nagasaki, Korea gains its independence due to Japan's surrender. While the streets of Jongno celebrate the event, Han-jung searches for the tomb of Mi-hyang, who lost her life.

Cast
Choi han jung: Jeon Chang-geun (全昌根)
Mihyang: Yu Gye-seon (劉桂仙)
Hyeja: Hwang Yeo-heui (黃麗姬)

Reception
The film was well-received by the then audience who was touched by the liberation of Korea.

Chiang Kai-shek is reported to have written a calligraphic banner that reads "Viva freedom! Viva Korea! (自由萬歲 韓國萬歲)" after watching the movie in China.

Literature
『한국영화전사』(이영일, 삼애사, 1969)
『한국시나리오선집』 I(영화진흥공사, 1982)

References

External links
 
 Adam Hartzell's review at koreanfilm.org
 

1946 films
Pre-1948 Korean films
Korean-language films
Lost Korean films
Korean black-and-white films
1946 drama films